Major-General Nyunt Win Swe is a Burmese military officer and current commander of Myanmar's Yangon Command. He was appointed to the post in June 2020, and previously served as the commandant of the Defence Services Medical Academy and commander of the Southwestern Command. In the aftermath of the 2021 Myanmar coup d'état, the military junta declared martial law in Yangon, the country's largest city, an act that effectively granted Nyunt Win Swe with administrative and judicial powers in Yangon's townships. Nyunt Win Swe led military and police forces who committed the Hlaingthaya massacre on 14 March 2021. He has been sanctioned by the European Union, Switzerland, and Canada for violating human rights and committing crimes against civilians in the Yangon Command.

See also 

 2021–2023 Myanmar civil war
 State Administration Council
 Tatmadaw

References 

Living people
Burmese generals
Year of birth missing (living people)